The Battle of Arlabán of 1812, also known as the Second Surprise of Arlabán, took place in the mountain pass of Arlabán, Guipúzcoa, Basque Country, near the border with France, on 9 April 1812, during the Peninsular War. A Spanish force of 3,000–3,500 men led by Francisco Espoz y Mina intercepted a great French convoy (2,000–3,000 regulars and 150 cavalry) of General of Division Caffarelli. 

The attack was a success, and after one hour, the French were completely defeated. The Spanish casualties were estimated at 30 killed and wounded, and the French lost between 600 and 700 men, and 300 captured. The Spanish also rescued 800 Spanish, British and Portuguese prisoners (five officers), and captured the valuable convoy (weapons and baggage, two colours, letters from Joseph Bonaparte to Napoleon, and a great amount of jewelry, valued between 700,000 and 800,000 francs). Joseph Bonaparte's personal secretary, Jean Deslandes, was killed in this action.

See also
 Battle of Arlabán (1811)

Notes

References

Further reading

External links
 

Battles of the Peninsular War
Battles of the Napoleonic Wars
Battles involving France
Battles involving Spain
Battles in the Basque Country (autonomous community)
1812 in Spain
April 1812 events